Luis María Garriga (born 14 June 1945) is a Spanish athlete. He competed in the men's high jump at the 1964 Summer Olympics and the 1968 Summer Olympics.

References

1945 births
Living people
Athletes (track and field) at the 1964 Summer Olympics
Athletes (track and field) at the 1968 Summer Olympics
Spanish male high jumpers
Olympic athletes of Spain
Place of birth missing (living people)